Preggo may refer to:

Slang for a woman who is pregnant
Pregnancy fetishism, contexts in which pregnancy is seen by individuals and cultures as an erotic phenomenon

See also
Prego (disambiguation)